Vic Barrett (born  ) is an American climate activist. He is a plaintiff in Juliana v. United States and appeared in a documentary about the case, Youth v. Gov.

Activism 

After experiencing Hurricane Sandy, Barrett started eating with the nonprofit Global Kids when he was 14. He was a fellow and then a senior fellow with the Alliance for Climate Education, working to expand climate education in public schools and encourage people to vote. In 2015, Barrett spoke at COP21 and joined the Juliana v. United States case. Barrett prominently protested at COP24, calling U.S. energy policy "a joke." The time commitment led him to temporarily withdraw from his undergraduate studies. In 2019, Barrett appeared in Ilana Glazer's Generator Series and promoted the September 2019 climate strike and spoke at the NYC strike in Foley Square. Barrett was nominated for a Pritzker Award from the UCLA Institute of the Environment and Sustainability in 2020. He is currently a network organizer for the Power Shift Network. Barrett has spoken about the power of storytelling in engaging people in activism.

Personal life 
Barrett is from White Plains, New York, went to an all-girls high school, and has studied political science at UW-Madison. He is neurodivergent, transgender, queer, and of Garifuna descent. Barrett is a first-generation American. He is a trans man and transitioned in 2017, after moving away for college. He has a tattoo that refers to the atmospheric carbon dioxide concentration in parts per million. He has identified Berta Cáceres as a personal hero.

References

External links 
 

Living people
1990s births
Garifuna people
People from White Plains, New York
Activists from New York (state)
LGBT people from New York (state)
Youth climate activists
Transgender men